Detria Russell (born August 21, 1973) serves as the executive director for the Martin Luther King Community Resources Collaborative located in the "Historic King District," Atlanta, Georgia.

Biography

Community activism and outreach
Since joining the local chapter of the Pine Bluff, Arkansas NAACP in 1995, Russell has fought for the civil rights and empowerment of socially and economically disadvantaged and underserved individuals throughout the United States via her volunteerism, club affiliations and diverse group of employers. Boasting many national community activism achievements in the medical arena and in affecting national housing initiatives, two of the most notable achievements for Russell are being appointed the first African American administrative fellow at MCG Health Inc. in 2000 and planning and participating in the shut down of global conglomerate Bear Stearns in 2008.  Ms. Russell continued her advocacy in the social justice arena by leading the execution of the first Fulton County Georgia Record Restriction event in 2016 and playing an integral role in the first Ending Mass Incarceration conference hosted in Atlanta, Georgia in 2019. This effort was led by Pastor Raphael Warnock, Senior Pastor of the Historic Ebenezer Baptist Church. It garnered support from Rapper TI and the event recognized Members of the Central Park Five. A critical output from this event is the Faith In Action Toolkit, in which Ms. Russell is featured and made significant contribution.

Early life/education 
Detria L. Austin was born August 21, 1973 in Little Rock, Arkansas to Alfred and Margaret Austin. She grew up in family businesses and learned business management and community outreach skills during this time.  She graduated from Spelman College with a Bachelor of Science in Biology in 1995 and went on to pursue studies at the University of Arkansas at Little Rock, where she received a Master of Health Services Administration in 1997. Ms. Austin was an inaugural fellow of the Health Advisory Board and completed the Diversity in Healthcare Management program.  Ms. Austin is an alumnus of both Leadership Augusta, Georgia and Leadership Pine Bluff, Arkansas.  Ms. Austin became Mrs. Russell, when she married boyfriend Jason Russell February 5, 2011. She is an active member of Alpha Kappa Alpha sorority, Junior League of Atlanta, Spelman College Alumnae Association, NAACP and enjoys mentoring young women and children. Mrs. Russell resides in Atlanta, Georgia.

Notable employers 
Since January 2015, Russell serves as executive director for the Martin Luther King Sr. Community Resources Collaborative (MLK Sr. CRC), an alliance of national and local non-profit organizations focused on eradicating poverty and hopelessness in Atlanta's "Old Fourth Ward", and "Sweet Auburn," districts.  Russell is charged with the responsibility of fostering a working network of free and low cost community services, via national and local community partners, to the underserved residents of the "Old Fourth Ward," and "Sweet Auburn." areas. Since the Collaborative's 2012 opening, Russell is the third person to hold the position of executive director. Former executive directors of the Collaborative are Dawn Brown and Lawrence Torry Winn.

Prior to becoming executive director for the MLK Sr. CRC, from May 2006 to July 2014, Russell worked for controversial national non-profit housing agency, Neighborhood Assistance Corporation of America (NACA). Russell served in several roles, with her last role being chief operating officer and governmental affairs/outreach liaison, whereas she worked under the direct leadership of chief executive officer Bruce Marks. While serving in her last leadership role at NACA, Russell fostered NACA's partnerships with national and local government leaders, agencies and other non-profits, while managing a large operations team to include over 40 NACA offices.

With a strong background in healthcare administrative services, Russell was a fellow at Georgia Regents University (Formerly known as Medical College of Georgia) and from 2004 to 2006, she held the position of assistant vice president of MCG Health, Inc., overseeing operations for the Medical Center and Children's Medical Center, in addition to, other MCG facilities. Russell managed a number of MCG services including food/beverage, volunteer and greeter services and the hospitals' cafeterias, as well as, its gift shops. During her tenure at MCG, to ensure non-English-speaking patients received the best medical services available to them, Russell was instrumental in developing and managing MCG's new Culturally and Linguistically Appropriate Services Department, which currently provides, expansive services such as, translators for the health care staff and non-English-speaking patients.

Awards
 Top 40 under 40 - Georgia Chamber of Commerce, Georgia Trend Magazine - October, 2004
 Young Gifted and Black - Georgia Times - 
 Trailblazers for the New Millennium - University of Arkansas at Pine Bluff’
 Member of the Year - NAACP, Pine Bluff Arkansas Branch 
 Volunteer of the Year -  Alpha Kappa Alpha Sorority, Inc.

See also
Martin Luther King Sr. Community Resources Collaborative Complex
Neighborhood Assistance Corporation of America (NACA)

References

External links
 Detria Russell, LinkedIn
 Detria Russell, Facebook
 Martin Luther King Sr. Community Resources Collaborative

1973 births
Living people